NA-52 Rawalpindi-II is a constituency for the National Assembly of Pakistan.

Area
 Gujar Khan Tehsil
 Choha Khalsa Circle 6 Union Councils of Kallar Syedan Tehsil

Members of Parliament

1970–1977: NW-27 Rawalpindi-II

1977–2002: NA-37 Rawalpindi-II

2002–2008: NA-51 Rawalpindi-II

2018–2022: NA-58 Rawalpindi-II

Detailed results

Election 2002

General elections were held on 10 Oct 2002. Raja Pervaiz Ashraf of PPPP won by 81,761 votes.

Election 2008

The result of general election 2008 in this constituency is given below.
Raja Pervaiz Ashraf succeeded in the election 2008 and became the member of National Assembly.

Election 2013

The result of general election 2013 in this constituency is given below.
Muhammad Javed Ikhlas succeeded in the election 2013 and became the member of National Assembly.

Election 2018

General elections were held on 25 July 2018.

See also
 NA-51 Murree-cum-Rawalpindi
 NA-53 Rawalpindi-II

References

External links
 Election result's official website
 Delimitation 2018 official website Election Commission of Pakistan

58
R-58